Lomanoše (in older sources Lumanoše) is a village in the Municipality of Gornja Radgona in northeastern Slovenia.

References

External links
Lomanoše on Geopedia

Populated places in the Municipality of Gornja Radgona